Malvi may refer to:

 The Malvi language
 The Malvi Dialect of Punjabi
 The Malvi breed of cattle